The English Electric M.3 Ayr was a British three-seat coastal patrol flying boat designed and built by the English Electric Company. The aircraft refused to become airborne and the project was abandoned.

Development
In 1921, English Electric's chief designer, William Oke Manning began work on designing an experimental small flying boat intended to meet a requirement for a single-engined four seat aircraft for artillery-spotting for the fleet. The design attracted the attention of the British Air Ministry, and two prototypes were ordered against Specification 12/21.

Manning's design, the Ayr, was a sesquiplane with swept (16 degrees) wings and heavy (20 degrees) dihedral on the lower wings. The watertight lower wings, mounted low on the hull where they were submerged when on the water, were intended to act as stabilising sponsons, eliminating the need for wing-tip floats. A Napier Lion  engine was mounted to the upper wing. The hull was designed by Linton Hope who had designed the Kingston hulls,  and accommodated the crew of four, with the pilot being provided with a cockpit amidships, positions for gunners in the aircraft's bow and in a dorsal location, while the observer was provided with an open cockpit just aft of the bow gunners position, and an enclosed position for operating the aircraft's radio inside the hull. Armament consisted of a Scarff ring carrying a single Lewis gun fitted in the bow position, with two Lewis guns fitted to the dorsal mount.

Construction of the prototypes began in 1923, but was slowed by work on English Electric's larger Kingston flying boat, with the first prototype not being completed until early 1925, being launched on 10 March 1925. Taxying at low speeds proved difficult, as the Ayr tended to rock from one wing to the other, although at speeds above , the wings were lifted clear of the water by hydrodynamic forces, although keeping a straight course proved difficult. When take-off was attempted, water thrown off the nose submerged the lower wings, pulling the aircraft down and making take-off impossible. These problems could not be resolved, and the project was stopped, with construction of the second prototype abandoned with it half built. The first prototype's hull was taken to RAE Farnborough along with that of one of the Kingstons, and was eventually abandoned on the Basingstoke Canal, sinking in the early 1950s.

Specifications

See also

References

 The Illustrated Encyclopedia of Aircraft (Part Work 1982–1985), 1985, Orbis Publishing, Page 1613
 
 

1920s British experimental aircraft
Ayr
Flying boats
Sesquiplanes
Cancelled military aircraft projects of the United Kingdom
Single-engined tractor aircraft